The Asian Beach Volleyball Championships is an international beach volleyball competition held every year in Asia and Oceania contested by the double-gender beach volleyball of the members of Asian Volleyball Confederation.

Men's tournaments

Summary

Medal table

Women's tournaments

Summary

Medal table

Total medal table

References

External links
 Website Official
 Asian Volleyball Confederation at Facebook
 Asian Volleyball Confederation at Twitter
 Asian Volleyball Confederation at Instagram

 
Beach volleyball competitions
Beach volleyball
Volleyball competitions in Asia
Recurring sporting events established in 2000
Asian Volleyball Confederation competitions